Coordinating Ministry for Human Development and Cultural Affairs is an Indonesian coordinating ministry. The ministry has the function to coordinate, synchronized and control governance in human development and culture.

Responsibility 
The ministry functions are:
 coordination and synchronization of formulation, determination, and execution of ministerial policy in human development and culture
 control of ministerial policy execution in human development and culture
 coordination of task implementation, guidance, and administrative support to all organization in the coordinating ministry
 management of state assets in responsibility of the coordinating ministry
 other functions from the President

Organization 
The ministry is organized as below:
 Office of the Coordinating Minister for Human Development and Cultural Affairs
 Ministry Secretariat
 Bureau of Planning and Cooperation
 Division of Strategic Activities Management
 Bureau of Law, Conferences, Organization, and Communication
 Division of Conference
 Bureau of Information System and Data Processing 
 Bureau of General Affairs and Human Resources
 Division of Leadership Administration and Protocol
 Sub-division of Coordinating Minister Administration
 Sub-division of Coordinating Minister Secretariat and Expert Staffs Administration
 Sub-division of Protocol 
 Division of Household Affairs and Procurement
 Sub-division of Household Affairs
 Sub-division of Procurement
 Deputy for Coordination of Social Welfare Improvement (Deputy I)
 Deputy I Secretariat
 Assistant Deputyship of Poverty Countermeasures
 Assistant Deputyship of Social Security
 Assistant Deputyship of Monetary Assistance and Accurately Targeted Subsidies 
 Assistant Deputyship of Disabled and Aging Population Empowerment
 Deputy for Coordination of Regional Development Equity and Disaster Management (Deputy II)
 Deputy II Secretariat
 Assistant Deputyship of Regional Development Equity
 Assistant Deputyship of Regional Empowerment and Spatial Mobility
 Assistant Deputyship of Disaster Management and Social Conflicts
 Assistant Deputyship of Emergency and Post-Disaster Management
 Deputy for Coordination of Quality Improvement of Health and Population Development (Deputy III)
 Deputy III Secretariat
 Assistant Deputyship of Nutrition Resilience and Health Promotion
 Assistant Deputyship of Diseases Control and Management
 Assistant Deputyship of Health Service Improvement
 Assistant Deputyship of Population Quality Improvement and Planned Family
 Deputy for Coordination of Quality Improvement of Children, Women, and Youth (Deputy IV)
 Deputy IV Secretariat
 Assistant Deputyship of Children Rights and Protection
 Assistant Deputyship of Women Rights, Protection, and Empowerment
 Assistant Deputyship of Youth Empowerment
 Assistant Deputyship of Family Resilience and Welfare
 Deputy for Coordination of Mental Revolution, Advancement of Culture, and Sport Achievements (Deputy V)
 Deputy V Secretariat
 Assistant Deputyship of Mental Revolution
 Assistant Deputyship of Cultural Advancement and Conservation
 Assistant Deputyship of Sports Achievement Improvement
 Assistant Deputyship of Literation, Innovation, and Creativity
 Deputy for Coordination of Quality Improvement of Education and Religious Moderation (Deputy VI)
 Deputy VI Secretariat
 Assistant Deputyship of Early Childhood, Basic, and Middle Education
 Assistant Deputyship of Vocational and Higher Education
 Assistant Deputyship of Religious Education
 Assistant Deputyship of Religious Moderation
 Expert Staffs
 Expert Staff for Strengthening of Political Stability and Government
 Expert Staff for Economical Resources Utilization
 Expert Staff for Maritime Resources Utilization
 Expert Staff for Sustainable Development
 Expert Staff for Bureaucracy Transformation
 Office of the General Inspectorate
 General Inspectorate Administration Office

References 

Government ministries of Indonesia